Ham is a cut of meat from an edible mammal's rear, usually from a pig.

Ham may also refer to:

Places

Belgium
 Ham, Belgium, a municipality

France
 Le Ham, Manche, a commune
 Le Ham, Mayenne, a commune
 Ham (Cergy), a village near Cergy, Val-d'Oise
 Canton of Ham, a canton in the départment of the Somme
 Ham, Somme, a commune in the canton

United Kingdom
 Ham Island, River Thames, Berkshire, England
 Ham, East Devon, a location in Devon, England
 Ham, Plymouth, Devon, England
 Ham, Cheltenham, a location in Gloucestershire, England
 Ham, Stroud, in Ham and Stone parish, Gloucestershire, England
 Ham, Kent, England
 Ham, London, in Richmond upon Thames
 Ham, Creech St Michael, a location in Somerset, England
 Ham, Mendip, a location in Somerset, England
 Ham, South Somerset, a location in Somerset, England
 Ham, West Buckland, a location in Somerset, England
 Ham, Wiltshire, England
 Ham, Caithness, Scotland
 Ham, Shetland, Scotland
 The Ham, Westbury, Wiltshire, England

United States
 Ham Lake (Hubbard County, Minnesota), a lake
 Ham Lake (Morrison County, Minnesota), a lake
 Winterham, Virginia or Ham

People
 Ham (surname)
 Ham (son of Noah)
 Ham Hyatt (1884–1963), American baseball player
 Ham Lambert (1910–2006), Irish cricketer and rugby union player
 Ham people of Nigeria

Arts and entertainment
 Hammaglystwythkbrngxxaxolotl or Ham, a character in Badger comic books
 Ham, a setting in Farmer Giles of Ham by J.R.R. Tolkien
 HAM (band), an Icelandic rock band
 "H•A•M", a song by Kanye West and Jay-Z
 H.A.M. (Happy Accessible Music), a 2016 EP by Joanna Wang

Acronyms
 Helsinki Art Museum
 His Apostolic Majesty, a style used by the Kings of Hungary
 Historic Arkansas Museum, Little Rock, Arkansas, United States
 Hold-And-Modify, a screen mode of the Commodore Amiga computer
 Homotopy analysis method

Codes
 Hamburg Airport's IATA code
 Hamlet (Amtrak station)'s station code
 Hewa language's ISO 630-3 code
 Hampshire, Chapman code

Other uses
 Ham-class minesweeper, a former British Royal Navy class
 Ham (chimpanzee), the first hominid launched into outer space
 Ham radio operator
 A performer who overacts
 Nippon Ham, a meat packing and food processing company founded in 1949 in Tokushima, Japan
 Tailor's ham, a curved mold for pressing garments
 , the group of Hamiltonian symplectomorphisms of 
 -ham, a generic suffix in place names in the UK and Ireland meaning farm, e.g. Rotherham

See also
 Ham-en-Artois, a commune in Pas-de-Calais, France
 Ham-les-Moines, a commune in Ardennes, France
 Ham-Nord, Quebec, Canada
 Ham-sur-Heure-Nalinnes, Belgium, a municipality
 Ham-sur-Meuse, a commune in Ardennes, France
 Ham-sous-Varsberg, a commune in Moselle, France
 Ham-Sud, Quebec, Canada
 Hamm (disambiguation)
 Hamming (disambiguation)
 Newham, a London borough
 East Ham
 West Ham
 South Hams, England
 Van der Ham, a Dutch surname